Kenneth Williams (born 17 January 1927) is an English former professional footballer who played as a wing-half in the Football League for York City, and was on the books of Rotherham United without making a league appearance.

References

1927 births
Possibly living people
Footballers from Doncaster
English footballers
Association football midfielders
Rotherham United F.C. players
York City F.C. players
English Football League players